Mary Elizabeth Daucher is an American biologist serving as the acting chief of the vaccine production program laboratory at Vaccine Research Center of the National Institute of Allergy and Infectious Diseases.

Life 
Daucher completed a Ph.D. in the department of genetics at the George Washington University Columbian College of Arts and Sciences in May 2007. Her dissertation was titled Virological outcome after structured interruption of antiretroviral therapy for HIV infection is associated with the functional profile of virus- specific CD8T cells. Daucher's doctoral advisor was Daniel Douek.

Daucher is the acting chief of the vaccine production program laboratory at the Vaccine Research Center of the National Institute of Allergy and Infectious Diseases (NIAID). Her areas of research include vaccine process design and development, regulatory strategy, and translational program management.

Selected works

References 

Living people
Year of birth missing (living people)
Place of birth missing (living people)
Columbian College of Arts and Sciences alumni
21st-century American women scientists
21st-century American biologists
American women biologists
HIV/AIDS researchers
Women medical researchers
American medical researchers
National Institutes of Health people